InterMedia Advisors, LLC (a..k.a. InterMedia Partners), is a private equity investment firm focused on leveraged buyout and growth capital investments in the media sector.

The firm, which was founded in 2005 by notable private equity investor Leo Hindery, is based on the 48th floor of the Chrysler Building in Midtown Manhattan, New York City.

Until 2014, firm's most notable investments were through its InterMedia Outdoor Holdings media company subsidiary which included Thomas Nelson, Hemisphere Media Group, Universal Sports, Control Room, Aspire, BlackBook Media, @Home Network, Sportsman Channel, Cinelatino, Soul Train Holdings, Vibe Lifestyle Network, Pasiones, Television Dominicana, CentroAmerica TV, Up, WAPA América, and Puerto Rican station WAPA-TV. The firm sold the division to Kroenke Sports & Entertainment which renamed the company Outdoor Sportsman Group.

Tom Daschle
In 2005, Tom Daschle joined the firm as a senior adviser.  It was during his time at InterMedia that Daschle reportedly had the use of a limousine and chauffeur that he did not report in his income taxes.

References

Sources 

Forbes Faces: Leo Hindery.  Forbes, October 12, 2000

External links

 Official website

Financial services companies established in 2005
Private equity firms of the United States